The 1971 North Dakota State Bison football team was an American football team that represented North Dakota State University during the 1971 NCAA College Division football season as a member of the North Central Conference. In their sixth year under head coach Ron Erhardt, the team compiled a 7–2 record.

Schedule

References

North Dakota State
North Dakota State Bison football seasons
North Dakota State Bison football